The 35th Legislative Assembly of British Columbia sat from 1992 to 1996. The members were elected in the British Columbia general election held in October 1991. The New Democratic Party (NDP) led by Mike Harcourt formed the government. Harcourt resigned as premier in February 1996; Glen Clark became party leader and premier later that month. The Liberals led by Gordon Wilson formed the official opposition.

Joan Sawicki served as speaker for the assembly until 1994 when Emery Barnes became speaker.

Members of the 35th General Assembly 
The following members were elected to the assembly in 1991:

Notes:

Party standings

By-elections 
By-elections were held to replace members for various reasons:

Notes:

Other changes 
Peter Dueck became an Independent on February 7, 1992. He resigns his seat on November 30, 1993.
David J. Mitchell resigns from the Liberal caucus to become an Independent Liberal on December 7, 1992. He resigns from the Liberals on to become an Independent on February 16, 1994. He resigns his seat on March 26, 1996.
Gordon Wilson and Judi Tyabji resign from the Liberals on September 11, 1993. On October 22 they form the Progressive Democratic Alliance.
 On March 14, 1994 Jack Weisgerber, Len Fox and Richard Neufeld join the Reform Party. They are joined by Lyall Hanson on May 11.
Robert Chisholm became an Independent April 11, 1995.
Robin Blencoe was expelled from the NDP caucus on April 4, 1995. He resigns from the NDP to become an Independent on December 29, 1995.
Allan Warnke resigns from the Liberals to become an Independent April 28, 1996.

References 

Political history of British Columbia
Terms of British Columbia Parliaments
1992 establishments in British Columbia
1996 disestablishments in British Columbia
20th century in British Columbia